John Hilary Smith,  (born 1928) is a British retired colonial administrator. Smith was the last governor of the united Gilbert and Ellice Islands before it was divided into Tuvalu and what later became Kiribati.

Smith was educated at Cardinal Vaughan Memorial School, University College London, and University College, Oxford. He joined the Colonial Service in 1950 and was stationed in Nigeria from 1951 to 1970. From 1970 to 1973 he was the financial secretary in the British Solomon Islands.

In 1973, Smith became the governor of the Gilbert and Ellice Islands, succeeding John Osbaldiston Field. In 1978, Smith oversaw the granting of independence to the Ellice Islands as Tuvalu. Upon Tuvaluan independence, Smith's tenure as governor came to an end. The Gilbert Islands continued as a colony headed by governor Reginald James Wallace until 1979, which it became independent Kiribati.

Smith donated his papers to the University of Adelaide. In 1964, he was appointed to the Order of the British Empire and the Commander of the Order of the British Empire in 1970. In 2009, he was appointed to membership of the Kiribati Grand Order.

References

"John Hilary Smith (1928-) Papers 1906-1979", adelaide.edu.au.

Further reading

 John Smith, An Island in the Autumn: How the Gilbert and Ellice Islands Gained Independence, (2011) . Publisher: Librario Publishing.

1928 births
British Solomon Islands people
Colonial Administrative Service officers
Governors of the Gilbert and Ellice Islands
Living people
People educated at Cardinal Vaughan Memorial School
People from colonial Nigeria
Alumni of University College London
Alumni of University College, Oxford
Civil servants from London
Commanders of the Order of the British Empire